"Feel Sick" is the fourth single released by Japanese rock band, The Teenage Kissers and the first single from their studio album, Virgin Field. The single was released in a special physical edition November 10, 2013 that was distributed only at live shows.

Track listing

Personnel
Nana Kitade – Vocals, lyrics
Hideo Nekota – Bass, music
Mai Koike – Drums
Tsubasa Nakada – Guitar
TEAK - Arrangement

References

External links
The Teenage Kissers Official Site

2013 singles
Nana Kitade songs
Songs written by Nana Kitade
2013 songs